The 2008 AFC Challenge Cup Final was a football match that took place on 13 August 2008 at the Ambedkar Stadium in New Delhi to determine the winner of the 2008 AFC Challenge Cup.

Venues
Due to the poor conditions of the pitch at Lal Bahadur Shastri Stadium, the AFC moved the majority of the matches to another venue. It was decided that ten matches would be played at the Gachibowli Athletic Stadium, and two at the LBS Stadium. Due to incessant rains in Hyderabad in the days leading up to the final, the AFC changed the venue of the final and the third place play-off to the Ambedkar Stadium in New Delhi.

Route to the final

Match

Assistant referees:
Tamam Hamdoun (Syria)
Mohammad Jaber A. H. Dharman (Qatar)

Fourth official:
Tayeb Shamsuzzaman (Bangladesh)

Match rules
90 minutes.
30 minutes of extra-time if necessary.
Penalty shoot-out if scores still level.
Maximum of three substitutions.

See also
 2008 AFC Challenge Cup

References

2008 AFC Challenge Cup
AFC Challenge Cup Finals
India national football team matches
Tajikistan national football team matches
2008–09 in Indian football
2008 in Tajikistani football
August 2008 sports events in Asia
Sport in New Delhi